Olesia Rykhliuk is a Ukrainian volleyball player.

She competed at five FIVB World Club Championships.  At 2015 Club World Championship in Zurich, Switzerland, won a bronze medal with Volero Zurich and received Best Opposite award and was a Best Scorer of the tournament. Also became a bronze medalist in 2017 Club World Championship in Kobe, Japan with Volero Zurich Club.

In season 2020/2021 won silver medal at CEV Cup with Galatasaray from Istanbul

Career
Alesia Rykhliuk won the bronze medal at the 2015 FIVB Club World Championship, playing with the Swiss club Voléro Zürich. She also won the tournament's Best Opposite award. She led the competition with 93 points, breaking Ekaterina Gamova's previous record of 85 points. Second time became bronze medalist of FIVB Club World Championship in 2017 with Volero Zurich.

In season 2020/2021 won silver medal at CEV Cup with Galatasaray HDI Sigorta from Istanbul.

Awards

Individuals
 2015 Club World Championship "Best Opposite"
 2015 Club World Championship “Best Scorer” 
 2016 Club World Championship “Best Server” 
 2017/2018 Best Scorer of Turkish Women’s Volleyball League 
 2015/2016 MVP Swiss League 
 2014/2015 MVP Swiss League 
 2013/2014 MVP Swiss League 
 2013/2014 MVP Swiss Cup 
 2014 Best Score of Top Volley Basel 
 2012/2013 MVP Korean V-League League 
 2012/2013 Best Spiker of Korean V-League 
 2011/2012 MVP All-Star Game Korean V-League

Clubs
 2015 FIVB Club World Championship -  Bronze medal, with Voléro Zürich
 2017 FIVB Club World Championship -  Bronze medal, with Voléro Zürich
 2020/2021 CEV Cup -  Silver medal, with Galatasaray HDI Sigorta

References

External links
 FIVB Profile
Player profile at Volleybox.net
 Ukrainian Pride Alesia Rykhliuk

1987 births
Living people
Ukrainian women's volleyball players
Ukrainian expatriate sportspeople in Italy
Ukrainian expatriate sportspeople in Turkey
Ukrainian expatriate sportspeople in Switzerland
Ukrainian expatriate sportspeople in South Korea
Sportspeople from Kyiv
Expatriate volleyball players in Turkey
Expatriate volleyball players in Switzerland
Expatriate volleyball players in South Korea
Galatasaray S.K. (women's volleyball) players
Beşiktaş volleyballers